John Hoffman may refer to:

John Hoffman (filmmaker) (1904–1980), American montage editor and filmmaker
John Hoffman (defensive end) (born 1943), American football defensive end
John Hoffman (running back) (1925–1987), American football running back
John Hoffman (baseball) (1943–2001), Major League Baseball catcher
John Jay Hoffman (born 1965), acting attorney general of New Jersey
John Robert Hoffman, American actor/screenwriter
John T. Hoffman (1828–1888), Governor of New York, 1869–1872
John Hoffman (Minnesota politician) (born 1965), Minnesota state senator
John Hoffman (Illinois politician), sheriff of Cook County
John D. Hoffman (1904–2004), American chemist and author
John H. Hoffman, space scientist

See also
John-Baptist Hoffmann (1857–1928),German Jesuit priest and missionary in India
John Beck Hofmann (born 1969), American screenwriter and director
John P. Hoffmann (born 1962), professor of sociology